The fourth season of Laverne & Shirley, an American television sitcom series, began on September 5, 1978 on ABC. The season concluded on May 15, 1979 after 24 episodes.

The season was broadcast on Tuesdays at 8:30-9:00 pm (EST). It ranked first among television programs and had a 30.5 rating. The entire season was released on DVD in North America on April 22, 2008.

Overview
The series revolves around the titular characters Laverne DeFazio and Shirley Feeney, bottle-cappers at Shotz Brewery in early 1960s Milwaukee, Wisconsin. Episode plots include their adventures with their neighbors and friends, Lenny and Squiggy.

Cast

Starring
Penny Marshall as Laverne DeFazio
Cindy Williams as Shirley Feeney
Michael McKean as Leonard "Lenny" Kosnowski
David Lander as Andrew "Squiggy" Squiggman
Phil Foster as Frank DeFazio
Eddie Mekka as Carmine Ragusa
Betty Garrett as Edna Babish

Guest starring
Paul Willson as Warren "Eraserhead"
Larry Hankin as Biff
Jay Leno as Joey Mitchell
Robert Alda as Monroe Harrison

Episodes

References

Laverne & Shirley seasons
1978 American television seasons
1979 American television seasons